Aclytia flavigutta is a moth of the family Erebidae. It was described by Francis Walker in 1854. It is found in São Paulo, Brazil.

References

Moths described in 1854
Aclytia
Moths of South America